The 2008–09 Louisville Cardinals women's basketball team represented the University of Louisville in the 2008–09 NCAA Division I basketball season. The Cardinals were coached by Jeff Walz, and the Cardinals played their home games at Freedom Hall in Louisville, Kentucky. The Lady Cardinals are a member of the Big East Conference and advanced to the NCAA championship match.

Offseason

Regular season

Roster

Schedule

Big East tournament
The Cardinals qualified for the finals of the Big East Women's Basketball Tournament. The Cardinals fell to Connecticut 75-36. The game was played at the XL Center in Hartford.

Player stats

Postseason

NCAA basketball tournament
Raleigh Regional
Louisville 62, Liberty 42
Louisville 62, Louisiana State 52
Louisville 56, Baylor 39
Louisville 77, Maryland 60
Final Four
Louisville 61, Oklahoma 59
Connecticut 76, Louisville 54

Awards and honors

Team players drafted into the WNBA

See also
Kentucky–Louisville rivalry

References

External links
Official Site

Louisville Cardinals women's basketball seasons
NCAA Division I women's basketball tournament Final Four seasons
Louisville
Louisville
Louisville Cardinals women's basketball, 2008-09
Louisville Cardinals women's basketball, 2008-09